Jugoslovensko sportsko društvo Partizan, commonly abbreviated as JSD Partizan, is a multi-sport club from Belgrade, Serbia. Founded on 4 October 1945, it is an umbrella organization featuring 30 clubs in 30 different sports.

History
Founded on 4 October 1945, in Belgrade (Yugoslavia) under the name Fiskulturno društvo Centralnog doma Jugoslovenske armije Partizan (roughly translated to English as Sport Society of the Central House of the Yugoslav Army Partizan).

Among the first teams at the club were soccer and athletics. By 1946 there were also basketball, chess, volleyball, tennis, and swimming teams. The next year, 1947, some more sections were founded: biking, boxing, hockey, table tennis, and motorcycling. And later some more – wrestling, judo, weight lifting, waterpolo, shooting, bowling, rowing, jumping in water, and handball.

The club's official name was changed in 1950.

Partizan Football Club

Honours

Yugoslav First League/Serbia and Montenegro First League/Serbian SuperLiga: 27
 1946–47, 1948–49, 1960–61, 1961–62, 1962–63, 1964–65, 1975–76, 1977–78, 1982–83, 1985–86, 1986–87, 1992–93, 1993–94, 1995–96, 1996–97, 1998–99, 2001–02, 2002–03, 2004–05, 2007–08, 2008–09, 2009–10, 2010–11, 2011–12, 2012–13, 2014–15, 2016–17National Cups: 16 1946–47, 1951–52, 1953–54, 1956–57, 1988–89, 1991–92, 1993–94, 1997–98, 2000–01, 2007–08, 2008–09, 2010–11, 2015–16, 2016–17, 2017–18, 2018–19National Supercup: 1 1989Mitropa Cup: 1 1978

Partizan Basketball Club

MenHonorsEuroleague: 1 . Winners  (1) : 1991–92Korać Cups: 3Winners  (3) : 1977–78, 1978–79, 1988–89National Championships: 21 (record)
 1975–76, 1978–79, 1980–81, 1986–87, 1991–92, 1994–95, 1995–96, 1996–97, 2001–02, 2002–03, 2003–04, 2004–05, 2005–06, 2006–07, 2007–08, 2008–09, 2009–10, 2010–11, 2011–12, 2012–13, 2013–14National Cups: 16 (record)
 1978–79, 1988–89, 1991–92, 1993–94, 1994–95, 1998–99, 1999–00, 2001–02, 2007–08, 2008–09, 2009–10, 2010–11, 2011–12, 2017–18, 2018–19, 2019–20Adriatic Championships: 6 (record)Winners  (6) : 2006–07, 2007–08, 2008–09, 2009–10, 2010–11, 2012–13Adriatic supercup: 1Winners  (1) : 2019

WomenHonorsNational Championships: 7 1983–84, 1984–85, 1985–86, 2009–10, 2010–11, 2011–12, 2012–13National Cups: 5 1984–85, 1985–86, 2010–11, 2012–13, 2017–18Adriatic League Women : 2 2011–12, 2012–13

Partizan Swimming Club

Partizan Waterpolo Club

MenHonorsYugoslav Water Polo Championship/Serbian Championship: 29 (record)
 1962–63, 1963–64, 1964–65, 1965–66, 1967–68, 1969–70, 1971–72, 1972–73, 1973–74, 1974–75, 1975–76, 1976–77, 1977–78, 1978–79, 1983–84, 1986–87, 1987–88, 1994–95, 2001–02, 2006–07, 2007–08, 2008–09, 2009–10, 2010–11, 2011–12, 2014–15, 2015–16, 2016–17, 2017–18Yugoslav Winter Championship: 6 (record)
 1963, 1965, 1968, 1969, 1971, 1972Yugoslav Cup/Serbian Cup: 25 (record)
 1972–73, 1973–74, 1974–75, 1975–76, 1976–77, 1978–79, 1984–85, 1986–87, 1987–88, 1989–90, 1990–91, 1991–92, 1992–93, 1993–94, 1994–95, 2001–02, 2006–07, 2007–08, 2008–09, 2009–10, 2010–11, 2011–12, 2015–16, 2016–17, 2017–18EuroleagueWinners (7) : 1963–64, 1965–66, 1966–67, 1970–71, 1974–75, 1975–76, 2010–11LEN Cup Winners' CupWinners (1) : 1990LEN Super CupWinners (2) : 1990–91, 2011–12LEN CupWinners (1) : 1997–98

WomenHonors National Cup: 1 2012–13

Partizan Handball ClubHonorsNational Championships: 9 1992–93, 1993–94, 1994–95, 1998–99, 2001–02, 2002–03, 2008–09, 2010–11, 2011–12Yugoslav Winter Championship: 1 1963National Cups: 11 (record)
 1958–59, 1965–66, 1970–71, 1992–93, 1993–94, 1997–98, 2000–01, 2006–07, 2007–08, 2011–12, 2012–13National Supercup: 3 (record)
 2009, 2011, 2012

Partizan Volleyball Club

MenHonors National Championships: 11 1945–46, 1946–47, 1948–49, 1949–50, 1952–53, 1966–67, 1972–73, 1977–78, 1989–90, 1990–91, 2010–11
 National Cups: 9 1950, 1961, 1964, 1971, 1974, 1990, 1991, 2022, 2023
 National Supercups: 1 2022

Women

 Yugoslav Championships: 8 1951–52, 1954–55, 1955–56, 1956–57, 1957–58, 1959–60, 1960–61, 1967–68
 Yugoslav Cups: 2 1959, 1960

Partizan Hockey ClubHonors Yugoslav Ice Hockey League/Serbian Hockey League : 20 (record)
 1947–48, 1950–51, 1951–52, 1952–53, 1953–54, 1954–55, 1985–86, 1993–94, 1994–95, 2005–06, 2006–07, 2007–08, 2008–09, 2009–10, 2010–11, 2011–12, 2012–13, 2013–14, 2014–15, 2015–16
 Yugoslav Ice Hockey Cup/Serbian Ice Hockey Cup: 3 1966, 1986, 1995Balkan LeagueWinners (1) : 1994–95Slohokej League (record)Winners (2) : 2010–11, 2011–12

Partizan Rugby ClubHonorsRugby Championship of YugoslaviaWinners (6)  1959, 1960, 1961, 1988, 1991, 1992Rugby Championship of FR Yugoslavia / Serbia and Montenegro (record)Winners (11) 1993, 1994, 1996, 1997, 1998, 1999, 2002, 2003, 2004, 2005, 2006Rugby Championship of SerbiaWinners (4)  2018, 2019, 2020, 2021Rugby 7Winners (3) 2013, 2018, 2021Rugby Cup of YugoslaviaWinners (3)  1957, 1960, 1992Rugby Cup of FR Yugoslavia / Serbia and Montenegro / Serbia (record)Winners (15) 1993, 1994, 1995, 1996, 1997, 1998, 1999, 2000, 2003, 2005, 2008, 2011, 2015, 2019, 2021

Partizan Athletics ClubHonorsMenNational Championships :Winners (25) : 1947, 1948, 1949, 1950, 1951, 1952, 1956, 1957, 1958, 1959, 1960, 1961, 1962, 1963, 1964, 1966, 1984, 1991, 1996, 1997, 1998, 1999, 2000, 2001, 2012National Cups :Winners (8) : 1965, 1991, 1996, 1997, 1998, 1999, 2000, 2001

WomenNational Championships :Winners (12) : 1974, 1975, 1978, 1979, 1980, 1991, 1996, 1997, 1998, 1999, 2001, 2003National Cups :Winners (16) : 1974, 1975, 1976, 1977, 1978, 1979, 1980, 1981, 1991, 1995, 1996, 1997, 1998, 1999, 2000, 2001

Partizan Wrestling ClubHonorsYugoslavian ChampionshipWinners (8) 1951, 1953, 1954, 1955, 1956, 1957, 1959, 1992Serbian ChampionshipWinners (2) 2008, 2009European ChampionshipWinners (1) 2009
More achievements can be seen on the club's official website here.Yugoslavian CupWinners (3) 1953, 1954, 1955Serbian Cup (record)Winners (12) 1998, 2002, 2004, 2005, 2006, 2009, 2010, 2011, 2012, 2013, 2016, 2021Serbian SupercupWinners (2) 2002, 2006

Partizan Judo ClubHonorsYugoslavian ChampionshipWinners (2) : 1963, 1964Serbian ChampionshipWinners (5) : 1995, 2000, 2005, 2007, 2008Serbian CupWinners (1) : 2007

Partizan Chess ClubHonoursYugoslavian ChampionshipWinners (23) : 1947, 1949, 1952, 1954, 1955, 1956, 1960, 1961, 1962, 1963, 1964, 1965, 1969, 1971, 1972, 1973, 1974, 1978, 1979, 1980, 1989, 1995, 2006Yugoslavian CupWinners (12) : 1958, 1961, 1962, 1963, 1965, 1982, 1988, 1989, 1994, 1995, 2005, 2006European Chess Club CupWinners (3) : 1954, 1955, 1956

Partizan Karate ClubHonoursMenChampionship of SerbiaWinners (1) : 2012European ChampionshipWinners (2) : 2000, 2001

WomenChampionship of Yugoslavia and Serbia & MontenegroWinners (4)Championship of SerbiaWinners (2) : 2011, 2018Serbian CupWinners (2) : 2011, 2012

Partizan Tennis ClubHonoursMenNational championshipsWinners (19) : 1952, 1953, 1955, 1956, 1959, 1961,1987, 1989, 1992, 1993, 1994, 1995, 1996, 1997, 2001, 2003, 2005, 2007

WomenNational championshipsWinners (12) : 1952, 1954, 1968, 1971, 1972, 1974, 1975, 1997, 2000, 2005, 2009, 2012

Partizan Bowling ClubHonorsNational Championships: 7 1993–94, 1994–95, 1995–96, 1999–00, 2000–01, 2006–07, 2018–19National Cups: 1 2018–19

Partizan Rowing Club

External links
 Football Club Partizan
 Basketball Club Partizan
 Water polo Club Partizan
 Swimming Club Partizan
 Handball Club Partizan
 Hockey Club Partizan
 Wrestling Club Partizan
 Shooting Club PartizanFans:'''
 JuzniFront.com
 Grobari1970.net
 IzaberiPartizan.com
 Partizan.net
 GrobariKrusevac.com

Sport in Belgrade
Multi-sport clubs in Serbia
1945 establishments in Serbia
Sports clubs established in 1945